Eamon Kelly (30 March 1914 – 24 October 2001) was an Irish actor and playwright. In 1966, he received a Tony Award nomination for his performance in the 1964 play Philadelphia, Here I Come!.

Childhood
Kelly was born in Gneeveguilla, Sliabh Luachra, County Kerry, Ireland. The son of Ned Kelly and Johanna Cashman, Kelly left school at age 14 to become an apprentice carpenter to his father, a wheelwright. He first became interested in acting after viewing a production of Juno and the Paycock.

Career
Kelly was an actor and storyteller who became a member of the RTÉ actors group, the Radio Éireann Players, in 1952. He is best known for his performances of storytelling on stage, radio, and television.  He was discovered as a story-teller by Mícheál Ó hAodha, then Director of Drama and Variety, following an informal performance at a Radio Éireann Players' party.

As an actor, he worked extensively with both the Gate Theatre and Abbey Theatre in Dublin. He was nominated for a 1966 Tony Award in the category Actor, Supporting, or Featured (Dramatic) for his role in Brian Friel's Philadelphia, Here I Come. He appeared on film in A Portrait of the Artist as a Young Man (1977).

He recorded Legends of Ireland with Rosaleen Linehan in 1985.

Filmography

See also
 Seanchaí - Traditional Irish storyteller, which Kelly often portrayed

References

External links
 
 Storytellers of Ireland
 RTÉ Documentary
 Irish Independent Obituary

1914 births
2001 deaths
Irish male stage actors
Irish male dramatists and playwrights
People from County Kerry
Irish male film actors
Irish male radio actors
RTÉ Radio presenters
20th-century Irish dramatists and playwrights
20th-century male writers
People from Gneeveguilla